This article lists fellows of the Royal Society elected in 1967.

Fellows 

Ernest James William Barrington
Sir Kenneth Lyon Blaxter
Eric Stuart Booth
Norman Adrian de Bruyne
Charles William Bunn
Sir Christopher Sydney Cockerell
Sir John Vivian Dacie
Frederick James Dent
Sir Charles Alexander Fleming
Sir Hugh Ford
Stephen Denis Garrett
Michael Anthony Grace
Emmeline Jean Hanson
Sir Alec Arnold Constantine Issigonis
Francis Edgar Jones
Raymond Urgel Lemieux
Sir Ieuan Maddock
Nicholas Avrion Mitchison
Joseph Arthur Colin Nicol
David Chilton Phillips, Baron Phillips of Ellesmere
Charles Henry Brian Priestley
Calyampudi Radhakrishna Rao
Sir Ralph Riley
Michael John Seaton
Norman Sheppard
David Henry Smyth
Franz Sondheimer
Sir Henry Peter Francis Swinnerton-Dyer
Douglas Frew Waterhouse
Richard Tecwyn Williams
Sir Alwyn Williams
John Michael Ziman

Foreign members 

Max Ludwig Henning Delbruck
John Franklin Enders
Robert Sanderson Mulliken
John Hasbrouck Van Vleck

References

1967
1967 in science
1967 in the United Kingdom